Sabine Haas (born 24 April 1975) is a German former professional tennis player.

Haas, a German Youth Champion at age 13, trained as a junior with Nick Bollettieri in Florida, as did her younger brother, future world number two Tommy Haas.

On the professional tour, Haas reached a best singles ranking of 315 and won an ITF title in San Antonio in 1995. She featured in four WTA Tour main draws as a doubles player, which included a quarter-final appearance at the Jakarta held 1997 Danamon Open, before retiring from the tour in 1998.

Her husband is German sports presenter Elmar Paulke.

ITF finals

Singles: 3 (1–2)

Doubles: 5 (1–4)

References

External links
 
 

1975 births
Living people
German female tennis players